Leptospira santarosai is a pathogenic species of Leptospira.

References

Further reading

External links
Type strain of Leptospira santarosai at BacDive -  the Bacterial Diversity Metadatabase

santarosai
Bacteria described in 1987